William Badger (January 13, 1779 – September 21, 1852) was an American manufacturer and mill owner from Gilmanton, New Hampshire. He served in both houses of the New Hampshire state legislature and was the 15th governor of New Hampshire from 1834 to 1836.

Biography
Badger was born in Gilmanton, New Hampshire. Educated at common school and at Gilmanton Academy, Badger worked after his school years to build a cotton cloth factory, a saw mill and a grist mill for his town. In 1804 Badger was made a trustee of Gilmanton Academy; he ultimately became president of the board for the school.

Badger served as an aide to John Langdon (Governor four different times, including 1805 to 1809). In 1810, Badger was elected to the first of three consecutive terms as a member of the New Hampshire House of Representatives (1810–1812); then he served three terms in the New Hampshire Senate (1814–1817) where he served as President of the Senate in 1816–1817. Badger served as Associate Justice, Court of Common Pleas (1816–1820), and as High Sheriff of Strafford County, New Hampshire (1820–1830). He was a Presidential Elector in the national elections of 1824, 1836 and 1844.

In 1834, Badger won the gubernatorial election, and he won the next term as well. As Governor, Badger called for eliminating capital punishment, a new idea for New Hampshire. He also had to deal with the breakaway Indian Stream Republic. Badger encouraged the legislature to support President Andrew Jackson's successful efforts to do away with the Second Bank of the United States (helping to bring on the Panic of 1837). Badger tried to inject new life into the state militia by statute; he also was interested in bringing smallpox prevention directly to the state's small farming towns.

See also
New Hampshire Historical Marker No. 235: Belmont Mill / Saving the Belmont Mill

References

A Guide to Likenesses of New Hampshire Officials and Governors on Public Display at the Legislative Office Building and the State House Concord, New Hampshire, to 1998 Compiled by Russell Bastedo, New Hampshire State Curator, 1998''

1779 births
1852 deaths
Democratic Party governors of New Hampshire
People from Gilmanton, New Hampshire
Presidents of the New Hampshire Senate
Democratic Party New Hampshire state senators
Democratic Party members of the New Hampshire House of Representatives
New Hampshire sheriffs
New Hampshire state court judges
1824 United States presidential electors
1836 United States presidential electors
1844 United States presidential electors